Patrick Power (born 1959) is an Irish former hurler.  At club level he played with Boherlahan-Dualla and was also a member of the Tipperary senior hurling team. He usually lined out as a forward.

Career

Power first played juvenile and underage hurling with the Boherlahan–Dualla club before joining the club's senior team. He first appeared on the inter-county scene with the Tipperary minor team that won the All-Ireland Minor Championship in 1976. Power progressed onto the Tipperary under-21 team and won back-to-back All-Ireland Under-21 Championship titles in 1979 and 1980. He subsequently made a number of league and championship appearances with the Tipperary senior hurling team during the 1980s.

Honours

Tipperary
All-Ireland Under-21 Hurling Championship: 1979, 1980
Munster Under-21 Hurling Championship: 1979, 1980
All-Ireland Minor Hurling Championship: 1976
Munster Minor Hurling Championship: 1976

References

External link

 Pat Power profile on Tipp GAA Archives website

1959 births
Living people
Boherlahan-Dualla hurlers
Tipperary inter-county hurlers